Jamsrangiin Dorjderem (born 13 December 1964) is a Mongolian judoka. He competed in the men's half-lightweight event at the 1988 Summer Olympics.

References

1964 births
Living people
Mongolian male judoka
Olympic judoka of Mongolia
Judoka at the 1988 Summer Olympics
Place of birth missing (living people)